= NGC 4352 =

Galaxy in the constellation Virgo

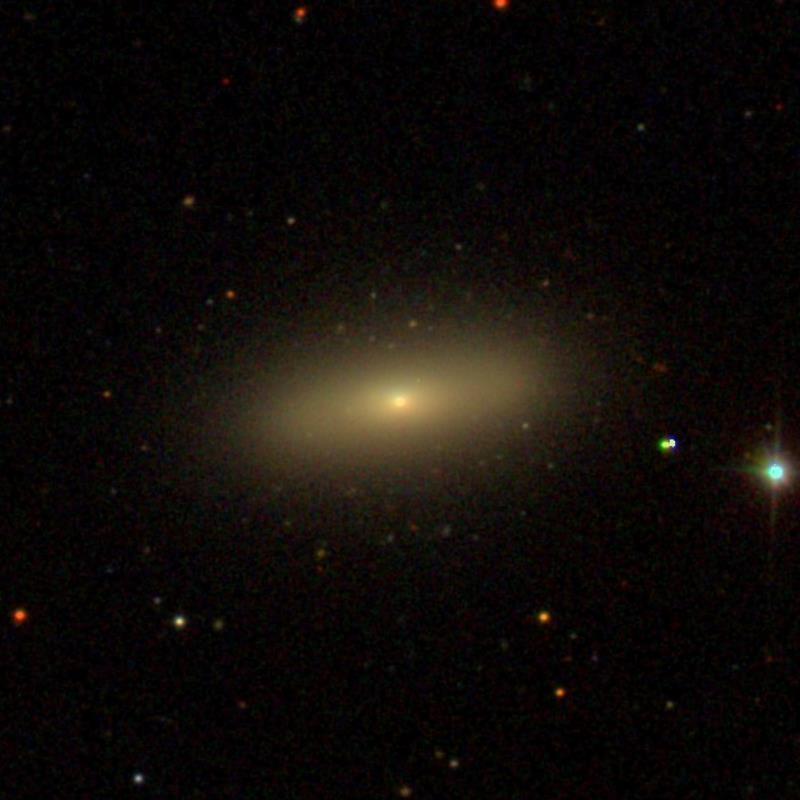
- SDSS image of NGC 4352

Observation data
- Constellation: Virgo
- Right ascension: 12^{h} 25^{m} 24^{s}
- Declination: +11° 04′ 27″

NGC 4352 is a lenticular galaxy located in the constellation Virgo. It was discovered on March 15, 1784 by the astronomer William Herschel.

== Globular cluster ==
According to a study published in 2008 and based on observations made with the Hubble Space Telescope, the number of globular clusters in NGC 4352 (VCC 398) is estimated at 114 ± 12.
